Stephany Eliza Pierrette Skrba, or shortly Stephany Skrba, (born April 13, 1987) is a Canadian female professional basketball player of Serbian descent. She plays on the power forward position.

Michigan statistics

Source

References

External links
Profile at eurobasket.com

1987 births
Living people
Canadian expatriate basketball people in the United States
Canadian people of Serbian descent
Canadian women's basketball players
Michigan Wolverines women's basketball players
Small forwards
Sportspeople from Etobicoke
Basketball players from Toronto